Turner Publishing Company is an American independent book publisher based in Nashville, Tennessee. The company is in the top 101 independent publishing companies in the U.S. as compiled by Bookmarket.com, and has been named four times to Publishers Weeklys Fastest Growing Publishers List.

History
Turner Publishing Company was founded in 1984 in Paducah, Kentucky as a publisher of books.

From 1984 to 2005 the company published specialty and commemorative titles focusing on history. During this period, Turner Publishing Company produced over 500 titles in the categories of military history, local history, and organizational history, including: History of the FDNY (New York City Fire Department) and History of the 101st Airborne Division.

In 2002 the company was sold to new management and moved to Nashville, Tennessee. Turner launched its move into trade publishing with a program of regional history titles in 2005. This series of local history photography books, called "Historic Photos," numbered over four hundred titles and sold nationwide through all major retailers of books with numerous bestsellers in local markets. After launching its first front list of national trade titles in 2007, Turner continues to produce a diverse list of an average of 25 new titles annually of fiction and non-fiction from leading authors.

In 2009 Turner commenced an acquisition program, beginning with the purchase of over 400 titles from the sale of Cumberland House. Turner acquired the book division of Ancestry.com the following year, as well as the assets of Fieldstone Alliance, a publisher of business books for non-profit organizations. Turner went on to acquire selected assets of Providence House, including the rights to bestselling author Eugenia Price.

Having reached capacity of its distribution facility by the year 2011, Turner outsourced distribution of its titles to Ingram Publisher Services. In 2013 Turner acquired over 1,000 crafts, pets, and general interest titles from John Wiley & Sons, including the backlist of Howell Book House. In 2014, Turner acquired Hunter House Publishers. In 2016, Turner acquired Jewish Lights Publishing and three other imprints from LongHill Partners. In 2018, Turner acquired Gurze Books.

In 2022, Turner acquired West Margin Press from Ingram Content Group.

Notable authors
Turner has over 2,000 titles, including 14 bestselling authors.

Alan Dershowitz – The Case for Israel
Don Felder - Heaven and Hell
Barney Hoskyns - Hotel California
Keith Olbermann - Worst Person in the World
Jack Cafferty – It’s Getting Ugly Out There
Tedy Bruschi - Never Give Up
Barbara Wood - Domina; under the pseudonym Kathryn Harvey - Butterfly
William F. Buckley
Deepak Chopra
Eleanor Clift
Tony Curtis
Kirk Douglas
Hank Haney
William Least Heat-Moon
Jack Nicklaus
Eugenia Price
Alice Randall
Sheri Reynolds
Scott Simon 
Candy Spelling
Dr. Ruth Westheimer (Dr. Ruth)

Imprints
Turner: The flagship imprint
Wiley: Turner publishes under the Wiley name, with permission, for over 1,000 acquired titles.
Ancestry: Genealogy, acquired assets of the book division of Ancestry.com
Fieldstone Alliance: Business Books for Non-profits, acquired assets of Fieldstone Alliance
Iroquois Press: Fiction and Literature
Ramsey and Todd: Children's books
Cumberland House Press: Titles acquired from Cumberland House Press in 2009
Hunter House
Jewish Lights
SkyLight Paths
Christian Journeys
Gemstone Press
Gurze Books
West Margin Press
Graphic Arts Books
Alaska Northwest Books

References

External links
Turner Publishing Company Official website

Book publishing companies based in Tennessee
Companies based in Nashville, Tennessee
Publishing companies established in 1984